Van den Berghe or Vandenberghe is a Dutch toponymic surname meaning "from the mountain". The first form is most common in East Flanders while the concatenated version is most abundant in West Flanders. Closely related names are Van den Berg, common in the Netherlands, and Van den Bergh. Notable people with the surname include:

Van den Berghe:
Alexis "Lex" van den Berghe, American reality show contestant
Christoffel van den Berghe (1590–1645), Dutch Golden Age painter
Frits Van den Berghe (1883–1939), Belgian painter
Garry Van Den Berghe (born 1960), Canadian curler
Herman Van Den Berghe (born 1933), Belgian geneticist
Paul Van den Berghe (born 1933), Belgian Roman Catholic bishop and theologian
Pierre L. van den Berghe (1933-2019), Belgian anthropologist and sociologist

Vandenberghe:
Georges Vandenberghe (1941–1983), Belgian cyclist
Hugo Vandenberghe (b. 1942), Belgian politician and academic
Roger Vandenberghe (1927-1952), French soldier in WWII and Indochina War
Tom Vandenberghe (b. 1992), Belgian footballer

See also
Van den Bergh

References

Dutch-language surnames
Surnames of Belgian origin
Surnames of Dutch origin